The Montaigu Tournament is an international association football competition that is contested by under-16 national teams and clubs. The tournament is also known as Mondial Minimes.

The games are held in stadiums located in the Vendée department of France. The final is played at the Stade Maxime Bossis in Montaigu.

History
The tournament was founded in 1973 by Dutchman, André Van Den Brink who was the president of FC Montaigu, a French amateur football team.

Famous players
Future famous international players joined Montaigu Tournament, such as:

  Cristiano Ronaldo
  Andrea Pirlo
  Pavel Nedved
  Gheorghe Hagi
  Carlos Tévez
  Marcel Desailly
  Didier Deschamps
  Thierry Henry
  Karim Benzema
  Carl Medjani
  Yoann Gourcuff
  Kylian Mbappé
  Hatem Ben Arfa

Results

Men's national teams

By year

By teams

Men's clubs

By year

By club

External links
 Official website
 Montaigu Tournament at rsssf.com

1973 establishments in France
Youth association football competitions for international teams
International association football competitions hosted by France
Recurring sporting events established in 1973